The United States Space Force's 4th Space Operations Squadron (4 SOPS) is a satellite operations unit located at Schriever Space Force Base, Colorado. 4 SOPS is part of Space Delta 8 and responsible for command and control of the Milstar/Advanced Extremely High Frequency, Defense Satellite Communications System Phase III, and Wideband Global SATCOM satellite constellations. The 4th Space Operations Squadron's mission is to operate the Space Force's protected and wideband MILSATCOM systems. They provide warfighters global, secure, survivable, strategic and tactical communication during peacetime and throughout the full spectrum of conflict. The squadron also operates three mobile constellation control stations at various locations in conjunction with host partners. At higher readiness levels and during exercises, these personnel deploy with U.S. Strategic Command and U.S. Northern Command respectively.

Additionally, they provide reliable space-borne communications to national authorities, U.S. and Allied forces. The 4 SOPS' motto "Linking the Forces" reflects the squadron's responsibility to enhance the nation's secure and wideband communications capability for today's military forces. Command and control of satellites is provided through dedicated Extremely High Frequency antennas and the Satellite Control Network.

The multi-satellite constellation links command authorities to high-priority U.S. forces via communications terminals on aircraft, ships, submarines, trucks, and ground sites with encrypted voice, data, teletype, or facsimile communications. They also provide secure high-rate data communications links to the President, Secretary of Defense, theater commanders and strategic and tactical forces worldwide.

History

World War II
Established under the 1st Photographic Group in May 1941. Performed aerial mapping primarily over the southwestern United States prior to the Pearl Harbor Attack using Beechcraft F-2 Expeditor variants of the Beechcraft Model 18 which were equipped for the reconnaissance role.

After the United States entry into World War II, flew aerial mapping missions over Western Canada and Alaska, mapping uncharted territory to support the building of the Alaska Highway. Deployed to South America in 1942–1943; mapping locations in British Guiana and Brazil for locations of emergency airfields as part of the development of the South Atlantic Transport Route.

Attached to 13th Air Force in late 1944; engaged in long-range mapping and reconnaissance over combat areas in support of seaborne landings in the Southwest Pacific Area and the liberation of the Philippines. Remained in the Pacific Theater after V-J Day performing reconnaissance mapping flights over Japan, Korea, and China. Unit largely demobilized on Okinawa. Inactivated in early 1946.

Air Force reserve
Active from 1947 to 1949 at Niagara Falls Municipal Airport as a reserve unit.  Apparently not fully manned or equipped.

Strategic Air Command
Reactivated in 1952 as part of Strategic Air Command. Mission was to gather intelligence on a global scale. The squadron operated Boeing RB-47 Stratojet medium bombers refitted for aerial reconnaissance and mapping missions. Flew day and night strategic reconnaissance missions over a global scale. Inactivated due to budget reductions in 1958.

Space unit
Activated at Falcon Air Force Station, Colorado in 1992 as a space unit. Four SOPS transferred to the United States Space Force on July 24, 2020, and became part of Space Delta 8.

Lineage
 Constituted as the 4th Photographic Squadron on 15 May 1941
 Activated on 10 June 1941
 Redesignated 4th Mapping Squadron on 13 January 1942
 Redesignated 4th Photographic Mapping Squadron on 9 June 1942
 Redesignated 4th Photographic Charting Squadron on 11 August 1943
 Redesignated 4th Reconnaissance Squadron, Long Range, Photographic on 15 June 1945
 Redesignated 4th Reconnaissance Squadron, Very Long Range, Photographic on 20 November 1945
 Inactivated on 14 April 1946
 Redesignated 4th Reconnaissance Squadron, Photographic on 5 September 1947
 Activated in the reserve on 20 September 1947
 Inactivated on 27 June 1949
 Redesignated 4th Strategic Reconnaissance Squadron, Medium on 9 May 1952
 Activated on 28 May 1952
 Inactivated on 1 July 1958
 Redesignated 4th Space Operations Squadron on 1 April 1992
 Activated on 30 April 1992

Assignments

 1st Photographic Group (later 1st Mapping Group, 1st Photographic Charting Group), 10 June 1941
 311th Photographic Wing (later 311th Reconnaissance Wing), 5 October 1944 – 14 April 1946
 Attached to 
 Thirteenth Air Force, c. 7 November 1944
 4th Photographic Group, December 1944
 6th Reconnaissance Group, 3 May 1945
 308th Bombardment Wing, 22 October 1945 – 14 April 1946

 First Air Force, 20 September 1947
 26th Reconnaissance Group, 23 October 1947 – 27 June 1949
 26th Strategic Reconnaissance Wing, 28 May 1952 – 1 July 1958
 50th Operations Group, 30 April 1992 – 24 July 2020
 Space Delta 8, 24 July 2020 – present

Stations

 Moffett Field, California, 10 June 1941
 March Field, California, 10 December 1941
 Detachments operated from various bases in Alaska, Canada, Central America, the Caribbean, and South America, between 1942 and 1944
 Peterson Field, Colorado, 4 January 1944
 Buckley Field, Colorado, 1 July – 14 October 1944
 Hollandia Airfield Complex, Netherlands East Indies, 7 November 1944
 Detachments operated from: 
 Wama Airfield, Morotai, Netherlands East Indies, December 1944 – January 1945
 Australia, January–May 1945
 San Roque Airfield (Moret Field), Mindanao, Philippines, April–June 1945
 Clark Field, Luzon, Philippines, June–August 1945

 Tacloban Airfield, Leyte, Philippines, 11 July 1945
 Detachment operated from Okinawa, August–October 1945
 Seoul Airport, South Korea, 25 October 1945 – 14 April 1946
 Niagara Falls Municipal Airport, New York, 20 September 1947
 Buffalo Airport, New York, 3 May 1948 – 27 June 1949
 Lockbourne Air Force Base, Ohio, 28 May 1952 – 1 July 1958
 Falcon Air Force Base (later Schriever Space Force Base), Colorado, 30 April 1992 – present

Aircraft
 Beechcraft F-2 Expeditor, 1941–1942
 A-29 Hudson, 1942
 B-34 Lexington, 1943–1944
 B-24/F7 Liberator, 1943–1946
 Unknown, 1947–1949
 Boeing YRB-47 Stratojet, 1953–1958
 Boeing RB-47 Stratojet, 1953–1958
 Boeing B-47 Stratojet, 1953–1958
 Satellites, 1992–present

List of commanders
 Lt Col Charles Thompson, March 1992 – June 1993
 Lt Col Kimber McKenzie, June 1993 – January 1995
 Lt Col Michael Mantz, January 1995 – August 1996
 Lt Col Philip Fitzjarrell, August 1996 – March 1999
 Lt Col Allan Kirkman, March 1999 – February 2001
 Lt Col Roger Teague, February 2001 – June 2003
 Lt Col Ronald L. Huntley, June 2003 – June 2005
 Lt Col John E. Shaw, June 2005 – June 2007
 Lt Col Tommy Roberts, June 2007 – June 2009
 Lt Col Douglas A. Schiess, 19 June 2009 – June 2011
 Lt Col Scott Trinrud, 24 June 2011 – June 2013
 Lt Col Monte Munoz, 19 June 2013 – July 2015
 Lt Col Sherman Johns, July 2015 – July 2017
 Lt Col Armon Lansing, 13 July 2017 – July 2019
Lt Col Timothy Ryan, July 2019 – 17 June 2021
Lt Col Brian Dea, 17 June 2021 – present

References

Notes

Bibliography

 
 
 
 

Squadrons of the United States Space Force
Military units and formations in Colorado